Grimmiales is an order of mosses in the subclass Dicranidae. It comprises four families: Grimmiaceae, Ptychomitriaceae, Seligeriaceae, and Saelaniaceae.

References

 
Moss orders